Sphaerodactylus townsendi, known commonly as the Townsend's dwarf sphaero or Townsend's least gecko, is a small species of lizard in the family Sphaerodactylidae. The species is endemic to Puerto Rico.

Etymology
The specific name, townsendi, is in honor of American zoologist Charles Haskins Townsend.

Habitat

Reproduction
S. townsendi is oviparous.

References

Further reading
Grant C (1931). "The sphaerodactyls of Porto Rico, Culebra and Mona Islands". Journal of the Department of Agriculture of Puerto Rico 15: 199–213. (Sphaerodactylus townsendi, new species, p. 208).
Rösler H (2000). "Kommentierte Liste der rezent, subrezent und fossil bekannten Geckotaxa (Reptilia: Gekkonomorpha)". Gekkota 2: 28–153. (Sphaerodactylus townsendi, p. 114). (in German).
Schwartz A, Henderson RW (1991). Amphibians and Reptiles of the West Indies: Descriptions, Distributions, and Natural History. Gainesville, Florida: University of Florida Press. 720 pp. . (Sphaerodactylus townsendi, p. 542).
Schwartz A, Thomas R (1975). A Check-list of West Indian Amphibians and Reptiles. Carnegie Museum of Natural History Special Publication No. 1. Pittsburgh, Pennsylvania: Carnegie Museum of Natural History. 216 pp. (Sphaerodactylus nicholsi townsendi, p. 156).

Sphaerodactylus
Endemic fauna of Puerto Rico
Reptiles of Puerto Rico
Reptiles described in 1931
Taxa named by Chapman Grant